Year's Best SF 3 is a science fiction anthology, edited by David G. Hartwell, that was published in 1998. It is the third in the Year's Best SF series.

Contents
The book itself, as well as each of the stories, has a short
introduction by the editor.
 Gene Wolfe: "Petting Zoo" (First published in Dinosaur Fantastic II, 1997)
 Michael Swanwick: "The Wisdom of Old Earth" (First published in Asimov's, 1997)
 Jack Williamson: "The Firefly Tree" (First published in Science Fiction Age, 1997)
 William Gibson: "Thirteen Views of a Cardboard City" (First published in New Worlds, 1996)
 S. N. Dyer: "The Nostalginauts" (First published in Asimov's, 1996)
 John C. Wright: "Guest Law" (First published in Asimov's, 1997)
 Gregory Benford: "The Voice" (First published in Science Fiction Age, 1997)
 Greg Egan: "Yeyuka" (First published in Meanjin, 1997)
 Terry Bisson: "An Office Romance" (First published in Playboy, 1997)
 James Patrick Kelly: "Itsy Bitsy Spider" (First published in Asimov's, 1997)
 Robert Silverberg: "Beauty in the Night" (First published in Science Fiction Age, 1997)
 Ray Bradbury: "Mr. Pale" (First published in Driving Blind, 1997)
 Brian Stableford: "The Pipes of Pan" (First published in F&SF, 1997)
 Nancy Kress: "Always True to Thee, in My Fashion" (First published in Asimov's, 1997)
 Tom Purdom: "Canary Land" (First published in Asimov's, 1997)
 Tom Cool: "Universal Emulators" (First published in F&SF, 1997)
 R. Garcia y Robertson: "Fair Verona" (First published in Asimov's, 1997)
 Kim Newman: "Great Western" (First published in New Worlds, 1997)
 Geoffrey A. Landis: "Turnover" (First published in Interzone, 1998)
 Paul Levinson: "The Mendelian Lamp Case" (First published in Analog, 1997)
 Katherine MacLean: "Kiss Me" (First published in Analog, 1997)
 Michael Moorcock: "London Bone" (First published in New Worlds, 1997)

External links 

1998 anthologies
Year's Best SF anthology series
1990s science fiction works